In Greek mythology, the name Medesicaste refers to two women of the Trojan royal house:

 Medesicaste, a daughter of Laomedon and thus a sister of Priam. Together with her sisters Aethilla and Astyoche, she was taken captive by the Greeks after the end of the Trojan War; the three sisters set fire to the Greek ships, causing the crew to remain and settle at the place they were staying at (either Italy or Thrace).
 Medesicaste, an illegitimate daughter of Priam and wife of Imbrius.

See also 
  for Jovian asteroid 4715 Medesicaste

Notes

References 

 Apollodorus, The Library with an English Translation by Sir James George Frazer, F.B.A., F.R.S. in 2 Volumes, Cambridge, MA, Harvard University Press; London, William Heinemann Ltd. 1921. ISBN 0-674-99135-4. Online version at the Perseus Digital Library. Greek text available from the same website.
 Conon, Fifty Narrations, surviving as one-paragraph summaries in the Bibliotheca (Library) of Photius, Patriarch of Constantinople translated from the Greek by Brady Kiesling. Online version at the Topos Text Project.
 Homer, The Iliad with an English Translation by A.T. Murray, Ph.D. in two volumes. Cambridge, MA., Harvard University Press; London, William Heinemann, Ltd. 1924. . Online version at the Perseus Digital Library.
 Homer, Homeri Opera in five volumes. Oxford, Oxford University Press. 1920. . Greek text available at the Perseus Digital Library.
 Pausanias, Description of Greece with an English Translation by W.H.S. Jones, Litt.D., and H.A. Ormerod, M.A., in 4 Volumes. Cambridge, MA, Harvard University Press; London, William Heinemann Ltd. 1918. . Online version at the Perseus Digital Library
 Pausanias, Graeciae Descriptio. 3 vols. Leipzig, Teubner. 1903.  Greek text available at the Perseus Digital Library.

Princesses in Greek mythology
Children of Priam
Trojans
Women of the Trojan war